Comana Monastery is a Romanian Orthodox monastery in Comana, Giurgiu County, Romania.

In 1461, the original Comana Monastery was founded and built by Vlad Țepeș (Vlad the Impaler) as a monastery-fortress.

Having fallen into disrepair, the original monastery was completely demolished and rebuilt in 1589 by Radu Șerban, future prince of Wallachia, Romania. Measuring , the new monastery was fortified with defensive walls and five towers. It was restored between 1699 and 1703 by Șerban Cantacuzino and again during the 18th and 19th centuries.

In 1861, the foundation of the original monastery built by Vlad Tepes was rediscovered by Ioan Brezoianu.

During archeological work performed in the 1970s, a headless body, which may be that of Vlad Țepeș, known as Vlad the Impaler, was discovered on the grounds of the current monastery. Historian Constantin Rezachevici and others believe that he may have been buried here, near the battlefield where he was killed.

Notes

External links

 Official site

Religious buildings and structures completed in 1461
Christian monasteries established in the 15th century
Romanian Orthodox monasteries of Wallachia
1461 establishments in Europe
Historic monuments in Giurgiu County
15th-century establishments in Romania